Necmi may refer to:

Given name

 Necmi Perekli (born 1948), Turkish footballer
 Necmi Sönmez (born 1968), Turkish-German curator, art critic and writer

Surname

 Ismail Necmi, Turkish independent photographer and filmmaker

Surnames
Turkish-language surnames
Turkish masculine given names